Michael Charles Backman (born January 2, 1955 in Halifax, Nova Scotia) is a former professional ice hockey right winger.  He was drafted by the World Hockey Association's Quebec Nordiques in the seventh round, one-hundredth overall, of the 1975 WHA Amateur Draft; however, he never played in that league.  Despite being un-drafted in the National Hockey League, he played eighteen regular-season and ten playoff games in the NHL with the New York Rangers over three seasons. Backman first played NHL hockey with the Rangers in the 1981-82 season, playing three games. He registered two assists that first year and the following year scored his first NHL goal.

Backman's elder son Sean is also a professional ice hockey player, as are his sons-in-law Jonathan Quick and Matt Moulson.

Championships
He won the 1983-84 CHL Championship (Adams Cup) as a member of the Tulsa Oilers team coached by Tom Webster.

References

External links

1955 births
Living people
Canadian ice hockey right wingers
Ice hockey people from Nova Scotia
Montreal Bleu Blanc Rouge players
New Haven Nighthawks players
New York Rangers players
Quebec Nordiques (WHA) draft picks
Sportspeople from Halifax, Nova Scotia
Springfield Indians players
Toledo Goaldiggers players
Tulsa Oilers (1964–1984) players
Undrafted National Hockey League players
Canadian expatriate ice hockey players in the United States